Abdullah Olaad Roobe is a Somali politician. He is the Deputy Minister for Information of Somalia, having been appointed to the position on 6 February 2015 by Prime Minister Omar Abdirashid Ali Sharmarke.

References

Living people
Government ministers of Somalia
Year of birth missing (living people)